The List is a Canadian reality television series, which debuted on November 13, 2007, on Slice. Hosted by Liza Fromer, the show will give participants the opportunity to live out a dream or goal.

References
 The List - Casting Call
 Liza Fromer interview on Sounds Like Canada, August 15, 2007

External links
 The List
 

2007 Canadian television series debuts
Slice (TV channel) original programming
Television series by Corus Entertainment
2000s Canadian reality television series